Jim Corsi may refer to:

 Jim Corsi (baseball) (1961–2022), American baseball pitcher
 Jim Corsi (ice hockey) (born 1954), Canadian soccer player, ice hockey goaltender, coach, and statistician